Ángel Humberto Rubalcava García (born 4 December 1992) is a Mexican professional footballer who played as a goalkeeper for Cimarrones de Sonora.

Rubalcava made his professional debut with Cimarrones de Sonora in the Copa MX.

References

1992 births
Living people
Association football goalkeepers
Cimarrones de Sonora players
Ascenso MX players
Liga Premier de México players
Tercera División de México players
Footballers from Sonora
Sportspeople from Hermosillo
21st-century Mexican people
Mexican footballers